Wonder Woman is a DC comic book superhero.

Wonder Woman may also refer to:

Comics
 Wonder Woman (Amalgam Comics)
 Wonder Woman (comic book), comic book series that has run in various forms since 1942
 Wonder Woman (Earth-Two), a fictional DC Comics superheroine
 Artemis of Bana-Mighdall, a DC Comics character who held the title of Wonder Woman
 Hippolyta (DC Comics), Princess Diana's mother, who took her place as Wonder Woman for a time (1997–1998)
 Orana (comics), a DC Comics character who claimed to be Wonder Woman for two issues
 Alternative versions of Wonder Woman

Film and television

 Wonder Woman (1974 film), a television pilot starring Cathy Lee Crosby
 Wonder Woman (2009 film), a direct-to-video animated film starring Keri Russell
 Wonder Woman (2017 film), starring Gal Gadot
 Wonder Woman 1984, a sequel to the 2017 film
 Wonder Woman: Bloodlines, a direct-to-video animated film starring Rosario Dawson 
 The Wonder Woman, a 2020 Taiwanese television series
 Wonder Woman (TV series), a 1975 television adaptation that starred Lynda Carter
 Wonder Woman (2011 TV pilot), an unaired television pilot starring Adrianne Palicki

Music
 "Wonder Woman" (Namie Amuro song)
 "Wonder Woman" (Kacey Musgraves song)
 "Wonder Woman" (Trey Songz song)
 Wonder Woman (soundtrack)

See also
 Wonder Woman 2 (disambiguation)
 Wonder Girl, the alias of multiple superheroines
 Wonder Women (disambiguation)